Abdoulaye Diallo (born 30 March 1992) is a professional footballer who plays as a goalkeeper for  club Nancy. He is a graduate of the Clairefontaine academy and joined Rennes in 2007. Diallo made his professional debut, at the age of 17, on 29 November 2009, in a league match against Lyon. Born in France, he represented that nation's under-20 team, before switching to Senegal, representing his parents' country of birth.

Club career

Early career
Diallo began his football career playing for his hometown club Stade Reims, joining the club as a youth player. In 2004, he was selected to attend the Clairefontaine academy and spent three years at the facility training at the academy during the weekdays and playing for Reims on the weekend. Prior to leaving Clairefontaine, Diallo agreed to join the nationally recognized youth academy of Stade Rennais on an aspirant (youth) contract. Rennes had been scouting the player since 2004.

Rennes
Diallo joined Rennes and was among a host of internationally recognized youth talents the club had comprised. These talents included youth internationals Elliot Sorin, Wesley Yamnaine, Jérémy Helan, who played for Manchester City in England, Abdoulaye Doucouré, and Axel Ngando. Diallo initially joined the club's under-18 team who were playing in their own league, the under-18 Championnat National. Rennes finished in 4th-place position, missing out on the playoffs. The 2008–09 season saw Diallo earn a place in the club's Coupe Gambardella team with the club attempting to defend their title from the previous season. In the tournament, the goalkeeper appeared in three matches and conceded four goals. Rennes suffered elimination in the Round of 16 losing to Le Havre.

Diallo was promoted to the club's Championnat de France amateur team for the 2009–10 season. He made his debut on 15 August 2009, earning a clean sheet in the team's 2–0 victory over US Sénart-Moissy. Diallo appeared in four more matches, before earning a call-up to the senior team on 20 November by manager Frédéric Antonetti for their league match against Le Mans in place of injured backup goalkeeper Cheick N'Diaye. Antonetti preferred the 17-year-old ahead of Patrice Luzi and Florent Petit, the third and fourth goalkeeper, respectively. Diallo appeared on the bench in the Le Mans match, with Rennes earning a 2–1 victory. The following week, Diallo was named the starting goalkeeper for the club's league match against Lyon, almost an hour before the match was set to be played, due to an injury picked up by starting goalkeeper Nicolas Douchez the previous day. Diallo started the match and played the entire 90 minutes in a 1–1 draw, making spectacular saves, including an important save in the 88th minute off a shot by Bafétimbi Gomis.

On 18 April 2010, Diallo signed his first professional contract, agreeing to a three-year deal.

Gençlerbirliği
On 28 June 2019, Diallo signed with Turkish club Gençlerbirliği.

Nottingham Forest
Following his release from Gençlerbirliği, Diallo joined EFL Championship side Nottingham Forest on 14 September 2020.

International career
Diallo was called up to the Senegal national team for the first time in March 2015, for the friendly matches against Ghana and Le Havre on 28 March and 31 March 2015.

In May 2018, Diallo was named in the Senegal national team's 23-man squad for the 2018 FIFA World Cup in Russia. He also participated in 2017 and 2019 Africa Cup of Nations.

Career statistics

Club

International

Honours
Rennes
Coupe de France: 2018–19

France U19 
 UEFA European Under-19 Football Championship: 2010

Senegal
Africa Cup of Nations runner-up: 2019

References

External links
Abdoulaye Diallo profile at staderennais.com

Living people
1992 births
Sportspeople from Reims
Citizens of Senegal through descent
Senegalese footballers
French footballers
Footballers from Grand Est
Association football goalkeepers
France youth international footballers
Senegal international footballers
2017 Africa Cup of Nations players
2018 FIFA World Cup players
2019 Africa Cup of Nations players
Ligue 1 players
Ligue 2 players
Championnat National 3 players
Süper Lig players
SC Tinqueux players
Stade de Reims players
INF Clairefontaine players
Stade Rennais F.C. players
Le Havre AC players
Çaykur Rizespor footballers
Gençlerbirliği S.K. footballers
Nottingham Forest F.C. players
AS Nancy Lorraine players
Senegalese expatriate footballers
Senegalese expatriate sportspeople in Turkey
Senegalese expatriate sportspeople in England
French expatriate footballers
French expatriate sportspeople in Turkey
French expatriate sportspeople in England
Expatriate footballers in Turkey
Expatriate footballers in England
French sportspeople of Guinean descent
French sportspeople of Senegalese descent